Cohen–Daubechies–Feauveau wavelets are a family of biorthogonal wavelets that was made popular by Ingrid Daubechies. These are not the same as the orthogonal Daubechies wavelets, and also not very similar in shape and properties. However, their construction idea is the same.

The JPEG 2000 compression standard uses the biorthogonal Le Gall–Tabatabai (LGT) 5/3 wavelet (developed by D. Le Gall and Ali J. Tabatabai) for lossless compression and a CDF 9/7 wavelet for lossy compression.

Properties

 The primal generator is a B-spline if the simple factorization  (see below) is chosen.
 The dual generator has the highest possible number of smoothness factors for its length.
 All generators and wavelets in this family are symmetric.

Construction

For every positive integer A there exists a unique polynomial  of degree A − 1 satisfying the identity

This is the same polynomial as used in the construction of the Daubechies wavelets. But, instead of a spectral factorization, here we try to factor 

where the factors are polynomials with real coefficients and constant coefficient 1. Then

and

form a biorthogonal pair of scaling sequences. d is some integer used to center the symmetric sequences at zero or to make the corresponding discrete filters causal.

For A = 1 one obtains the orthogonal Haar wavelet.

Tables of coefficients

For A = 2 one obtains in this way the LeGall 5/3-wavelet:

For A = 4 one obtains the 9/7-CDF-wavelet. One gets , this polynomial has exactly one real root, thus it is the product of a linear factor  and a quadratic factor. The coefficient c, which is the inverse of the root, has an approximate value of −1.4603482098.

For the coefficients of the centered scaling and wavelet sequences one gets numerical values in an implementation–friendly form

Numbering

There are two concurring numbering schemes for wavelets of the CDF family:
 the number of smoothness factors of the lowpass filters, or equivalently the number of vanishing moments of the highpass filters, e.g. "2, 2";
 the sizes of the lowpass filters, or equivalently the sizes of the highpass filters, e.g. "5, 3".

The first numbering was used in Daubechies' book Ten lectures on wavelets.
Neither of this numbering is unique. The number of vanishing moments does not tell about the chosen factorization. A filter bank with filter sizes 7 and 9 can have 6 and 2 vanishing moments when using the trivial factorization, or 4 and 4 vanishing moments as it is the case for the JPEG 2000 wavelet.  The same wavelet may therefore be referred to as "CDF 9/7" (based on the filter sizes) or "biorthogonal 4, 4" (based on the vanishing moments).  Similarly, the same wavelet may therefore be referred to as "CDF 5/3" (based on the filter sizes) or "biorthogonal 2, 2" (based on the vanishing moments).

Lifting decomposition

For the trivially factorized filterbanks a lifting decomposition can be explicitly given.

Even number of smoothness factors

Let  be the number of smoothness factors in the B-spline lowpass filter,
which shall be even.

Then define recursively
 

The lifting filters are
 

Conclusively, the interim results of the lifting are
 

which leads to
 

The filters  and  constitute the CDF-n,0 filterbank.

Odd number of smoothness factors

Now, let  be odd.

Then define recursively
 

The lifting filters are
 

Conclusively, the interim results of the lifting are
 

which leads to
 
where we neglect the translation and the constant factor.

The filters  and  constitute the CDF-n,1 filterbank.

Applications
The Cohen–Daubechies–Feauveau wavelet and other biorthogonal wavelets have been used to compress fingerprint scans for the FBI. A standard for compressing fingerprints in this way was developed by Tom Hopper (FBI), Jonathan Bradley (Los Alamos National Laboratory) and Chris Brislawn (Los Alamos National Laboratory). By using wavelets, a compression ratio of around 20 to 1 can be achieved, meaning a 10 MB image could be reduced to as little as 500 kB while still passing recognition tests.

External links
 JPEG 2000: How does it work?
 
 CDF 9/7 Wavelet Transform for 2D Signals via Lifting: Source code in Python
 Open Source 5/3-CDF-Wavelet implementation in C#, for arbitrary lengths

References

Biorthogonal wavelets